Oriana Junco (born 4 January 1971) is an Argentine actress and media personality.

Life and career

Oriana Junco was born on 4 January 1971 in Buenos Aires to Juan Carlos Junco and Catalina Ester Zapatero. She worked as a public relations officer for 20 years.

Filmography
 Me gusta ser mujer (1993)
 Much Dance (2001)
 Zap TV (2002)
 Sin código (2005–2006)
 Los únicos (2011)
 Pasión de sábado (2011)
 SQP (2011–2013)
 Infama (2013)
 Malas muchachas (2013)
 Periodismo para todos (2014)
 El muro infernal (2020)

References

1971 births
20th-century Argentine actresses
20th-century Argentine LGBT people
21st-century Argentine actresses
21st-century Argentine LGBT people
Actresses from Buenos Aires
Living people
Argentine LGBT actors
Argentine transgender people
Transgender actresses